The Delhi & District Cricket Association (DDCA) is the governing body of Cricket activities in the Delhi state of India and the Delhi cricket team. It is affiliated to the Board of Control for Cricket in India. The Delhi cricket team is the team for Delhi & District Cricket Association in the Ranji Trophy. The Delhi & District Cricket Association also plays with the name of DDCA President's XI, and participates in premier tournaments abroad and in India.The DDCA is responsible for all U14, U16, U19, U23, Senior, Womens U19.

Allegations
BJP MP Kirti Azad and Delhi Chief Minister Arvind Kejriwal have alleged corruption in DDCA against Union Finance Minister Arun Jaitley. Ram Jethmalani, a RJD MP and senior lawyer, has also accused Arun Jaitley of corruption and will fight a court case. Retired IPS Officer KPS Gill has also accused Arun Jaitley of corruption in the Hockey Federation of India. Kirti Azad has been suspended from the party for anti-party activities. On 17 November 2015 the Sanghi Committee gave a report to the Chief Minister of Delhi highlighting glaring irregularities in the affairs of DDCA and recommended setting up of a Commission of Enquiry. On 16 November 2019 , Rajat Sharma, president DDCA resigned alleging irregularities in DDCA.

References

Cricket administration in India
Cricket in Delhi
1883 establishments in India
Sports organizations established in 1883